Ugly Betty is an American comedy-drama television series developed by Silvio Horta, which was originally broadcast on ABC. It premiered on September 28, 2006, and ended on April 14, 2010. The series is based on Fernando Gaitán's Colombian telenovela Yo soy Betty, la fea, which has had many other international adaptations. It revolves around the character Betty Suarez, whodespite her lack of stylelands a job at a prestigious fashion magazine. It was produced by Silent H, Ventanarosa, and Reveille Productions partnered with ABC Studios, with Salma Hayek, Horta, Ben Silverman, Jose Tamez, and Joel Fields serving as executive producers. The pilot was filmed in New York City; seasons one and two were filmed in Los Angeles and seasons three and four were filmed in New York City.

During its first three seasons, it aired on Thursday nights, where it was mostly successful. However, viewership dropped significantly in the show's third season, particularly in the 18–49 age group. In October 2009, the series was moved to Fridays, where it had trouble finding an audience. The backlash from its fans prompted ABC to move the show to Wednesdays at 10:00 pm Eastern/9:00 pm Central starting January 6, 2010, where it was thought to better complement its Wednesday hits Modern Family and Cougar Town. Despite this, on January 27, 2010, ABC announced it was cancelling the series due to low ratings. In the years since, it has gained a cult following. For a time, there was discussion of a reboot or Ugly Betty movie.

Production
The idea to bring Ugly Betty to American TV screens began in 2001 when NBC was planning to adapt Betty as a half-hour comedy, which would be produced by Sony Pictures Television but it did not get past the planning stages (three writers were needed to come up with a concept based around the character) until ABC and Hayek's company came on board in 2004 and retooled it as an hour-long comedy drama. Two years later, on May 16, 2006, ABC announced that Ugly Betty would be part of the 2006–2007 North American season lineup as a weekly hour-long series; the initial order was for 13 episodes.

ABC had announced the title of the series would be Betty the Ugly, a change from its developmental title, but changed it back to Ugly Betty on July 14, 2006, although the Ugly Betty title was already being used in promotions prior to this date on Citytv. Speculation indicated the show would be a daily serial that would have debuted as a summer 2006 or midseason 2007 entry, but given the buzz and growing interest in the show, the network decided to make it a weekly series, instead. On August 8, 2006, ABC decided at the last minute to make a schedule change to move Ugly Betty from its previously announced Friday 8 pm (ET) time period to Thursday at 8 pm, replacing sitcoms Notes from the Underbelly and Big Day as a lead-in to top-rated program Grey's Anatomy, due to the growing interest in the show.

The program's pilot was tested on several cable providers to gauge interest and feedback from viewers, most notably the Hispanic community, including those who are fans of the original Betty, who hoped that ABC would maintain the integrity of the original. ABC also allowed its affiliates to show free off-air screenings to the public at various events ahead of the show's debut. In addition, the network screened the debut episode on the web and made the episodes available for download on iTunes after their initial airings on January 5, 2007. The encore episodes also have run on ABC Family and SOAPnet, both of which have aired marathons of the show.

On October 13, 2006, ABC ordered a full season pick-up for the series, beyond the original 13 ordered at the May Upfronts due to its premiere ratings. ABC originally announced 22 episodes for season one, but increased the number of episodes by one to 23. The season finale is the episode called "East Side Story". On March 21, 2007, ABC renewed the series for a second season.

Although he subsequently joined NBC as their new entertainment head, Ben Silverman remained co-executive producer on the show, but in a limited role.

In November 2007, the cast of the series made headlines when they threw their support behind the 2007 Writers' Strike by joining them on the picket line in solidarity. Ferrera commented on the reason they did this: "The issues coming up with the actors' contracts are very similar to what the writers are dealing with right now, and we have to stay united and stand strong within the creative community for what we believe is fair." On November 25, the cast appeared in a 38-second video for "Speechless Hollywood" in which a black & white camera pulled away from a close up of Ferrera to show her co-stars sitting next to her as they look directly at the camera without speaking.

On February 11, 2008, ABC picked up Ugly Betty for the 2008–09 television season, along with nine other shows. On the same day the renewal was announced, two of the show's executive producers, Marco Pennette and James Hayman, were let go. Their departure added to the constant off-camera turnovers on the series, including the exiting or firing of five writers. In a Q&A from TV Guide, Michael Ausiello criticized the decision, saying, "someone saw fit to fix what wasn't broken" and praised the two men for writing several of the show's best episodes. These turns of events may have also contributed to Rebecca Romijn's decision to no longer be a full-time regular on the series in the third season, citing the move by new writers to make changes in the direction of several characters, especially Romijn's role as Alexis.

With the strike over as of February 12,  the possibility existed for seven new episodes to be completed by April, bringing the number of second-season episodes produced to 20, but only 18 episodes were eventually produced. As a result of the strike, creator Silvio Horta delayed plans for a musical episode and having Lindsay Lohan on board for a possible storyline until the third season. Four days later on February 16, 2008, ABC picked up Ugly Betty for the 2008–09 television season.

On March 12, 2008, Horta signed a two-year, seven-figure deal with ABC Studios, which guaranteed the show's future and gave Horta a chance to produce other projects aside from Betty.

On April 17, 2008, the show's podcast, which was usually presented in audio and hosted by stars Urie and Newton, became available on video for the first time.

On May 6, 2008, ABC announced that starting with the third season, Ugly Betty would return to New York City and start production there. The move was done to bring the authenticity of the great series' setting into the show and to take advantage of a tax credit offered by the State of New York's Governor's Office of Motion Picture and Television Development. The production returned to Silvercup Studios in Queens, where the original pilot was produced.  The move resulted in several Los Angeles crew members being let go. These events led California Assemblyman Paul Krekorian to introduce bill AB X315, the "Ugly Betty Bill", which would keep television and film production from leaving the state by using tax incentives. The bill was passed by the assembly and Governor Arnold Schwarzenegger signed it into law on February 19, 2009.

In January 2009, ABC announced that it was putting Ugly Betty on hold to make room for the new comedies In the Motherhood and Samantha Who? in the Thursday night time slot. The series' aired one more original episode on March 19, 2009. On Sunday, March 15, 2009, ABC announced that, after a five-week break, Ugly Betty would return for its final five episodes of the season on Thursday, April 30, 2009. Ugly Bettys return was originally planned for May 7, but due to low ratings for Motherhood, ABC moved it up a week. The two-episode season finale aired on Thursday, May 21 from 8–10 pm.

The move by ABC and the show's declining ratings led viewers to believe that ABC would cancel the show, but on February 17, 2009, Becki Newton stated that the show has been picked up for a fourth season. That statement would later be confirmed on March 5, 2009, when Stephen McPherson, president of ABC Entertainment Group, announced that ABC planned to renew Ugly Betty. On April 23, 2009, ABC gave an early fourth season renewal to Betty.

Ugly Betty  began airing on Friday nights starting October 16, 2009, at 9:00 pm Eastern/8:00 pm Central, although it was originally scheduled to start a week earlier on October 9. This caused fans and critics to worry that ABC wished to end the show, since that time slot is perceived as the Friday night death slot.ABC's Official Sked Welcomes "V", Moves "Betty", Says Adieu to "Who?" , TV Guide, May 19, 2009ABC Puts "Ugly Betty" In An Ugly Timeslot , Business Insider, May 19, 2009 On July 24, 2009, TV Guide Network announced that it had acquired the exclusive cable rights to the show and would air the fourth-season episodes two weeks after their ABC run with an option to strip the show daily, with plans to air it weekly starting in the fall of 2010.

With Eastwick recently cancelled, ABC began considering moving Ugly Betty to the Wednesday night 10:00 pm Eastern/9:00 pm Central timeslot,AfterElton Reports That "Ugly Betty"'s Move to Wednesdays is Confirmed , TV By the Numbers, November 10, 2009 although talks arose of moving Lost to that same time slot. On December 1, 2009, ABC, sensing a backlash from viewers over its decision to move Ugly Betty to Fridays, its sliding ratings, and praises from critics over the improved storylines, made the move to Wednesday official by announcing that it would start airing new episodes on its new night starting January 6, 2010.

Plot

Betty Suarez is a quirky, 22-year-old Mexican American woman from Queens, New York, who is sorely lacking in fashion sense. She is known for her adult braces, rather unusual wardrobe choices, sweet nature, and slight naïveté. She is abruptly thrust into a different world when she lands a job at Mode, a trendy, high-fashion magazine based in Manhattan that is part of the publishing empire Meade Publications owned by the wealthy Bradford Meade. Bradford's son, Daniel, has been installed as editor-in-chief of Mode following the death of Fey Sommers (Bradford's longtime mistress). Bradford hires the inexperienced Betty as his womanizing son's newest personal assistant to curb his habit of sleeping with his assistants. As time goes by, Betty and Daniel become friends and help each other navigate their individual professional and personal lives.

Life at Mode is made difficult for both Betty and Daniel by their co-workers. Their most serious threat comes from creative director Wilhelmina Slater, a vindictive schemer who devises numerous plots to steal Daniel's job and seize control of the Meade empire. In addition, Wilhelmina's loyal assistant Marc St. James and Mode receptionist Amanda Tanen continually mock and humiliate Betty for her lackluster physical appearance, awkward nature, and initial lack of taste in fashion, though they both ultimately warm to Betty in later seasons. However, not everyone at Mode is against Betty; she gains loyal friends in Scottish seamstress Christina McKinney and nerdy accountant Henry Grubstick. She also receives strong support from her father, Ignacio, older sister, Hilda, and nephew, Justin.

Season 1: 2006–2007

Season one premiered in the United States on September 28, 2006, and aired 23 episodes. Major plot lines during the first season include: Betty and Daniel settling into their respective roles as personal assistant and editor-in-chief at Mode fashion magazine; Betty's relationships with pre-Mode boyfriend Walter and new love interest Henry; Daniel's numerous sexual relationships and his relationship with fellow editor Sofia Reyes (Salma Hayek); Wilhelmina's plots with the "Mystery Lady" to undermine Bradford and Daniel's positions at Meade Publications; Christina's temporary switch to Wilhelmina's side in an attempt to boost her career; the truth behind the murder of Fey Sommers and the death of Daniel's older brother Alex; Ignacio's immigration status and health problems; and Hilda's struggle to find a new career and salvage her relationship with Justin's dad, Santos.

Season 2: 2007–2008

The season's theme was "Brighter, Bolder, Bettyer" with a reworked version of Mika's "Hey Betty (You Are Beautiful)" being used as the featured song in its promos. Nine new recurring characters, played by Freddy Rodríguez, Illeana Douglas, Alec Mapa, David Blue, John Cho, Gabrielle Union, Gene Simmons, and Eddie Cibrian were introduced. Lorraine Toussaint continued in her role as Claire's fellow prison escapee, Yoga, as a recurring character.  Production was halted in November 2007 due to the Writers Guild of America strike; ultimately, the season episode order was cut to 18 instead of a proposed 23. New episodes did not air on U.S. television until April 24, 2008, starting with "Twenty Four Candles", and ending on May 22, 2008, with "Jump". This was the last episode to be produced in Los Angeles.

Major plotlines this season include the love triangle between Betty, Henry, and a deli shop worker named Giovanni "Gio" Rossi; Claire's escape from prison, recapture, and trial for the murder of Fey Sommers; the aborted wedding of Wilhelmina Slater and Bradford Meade; Hilda and Justin's reaction to the murder of Santos in the season-one finale; Daniel and Alexis's power struggle for Mode after their father's death; Amanda's search for her biological father; Marc's relationship with fashion photographer Cliff St. Paul; Hilda's attempt to start her new beautician career and a relationship with Justin's gym teacher; Christina's reunion with her recovering alcoholic husband; and Wilhelmina's scheme to conceive an heir to the Meade fortune using Bradford's sperm.

Season 3: 2008–2009

ABC renewed the series for a third season on February 11, 2008. In addition, production was moved to New York City from Los Angeles to make the series more realistic and to take advantage of increased tax incentives in New York. The third season premiered on September 25, 2008. This season added 10 new recurring regulars, played by Grant Bowler, Mark Consuelos, Heather Tom, Val Emmich, Ralph Macchio, Sarah Lafleur, Bernadette Peters, Lauren Velez, and Daniel Eric Gold. Lindsay Lohan, Julian De La Celle, Derek Riddell, and Eddie Cibrian returned from the second season for more appearances. "The Show" by Australian singer Lenka was used as the promo theme for the season.

The season begins with Betty moving to an apartment in the city, after rejecting both Henry and Gio. Major plotlines include Daniel and Wilhelmina's respective relationships with Molly and Connor—a former couple; Betty and Marc both competing in the YETI program, a series of classes for aspiring editors; Betty's new relationship with Matt Hartley, a wealthy sports editor also taking part in YETI; Christina's surrogate pregnancy for Wilhelmina, and later belief that the baby is in fact her own; Molly developing terminal cancer and Ignacio's heart problems resulting in Betty having to return home, resulting in Marc and Amanda taking on Betty's apartment.

The season was the last that featured Rebecca Romijn and Ashley Jensen as regulars, with Romijin's character, Alexis, moving to France to be with her son early in the season and Jensen's character, Christina, returning to Scotland with her family in episode 21.

Season 4: 2009–2010

Following dropping ratings in season three, Ugly Betty was moved from its Thursday night slot to the "Friday night death slot", resulting in further ratings decreases and protests from fans. Despite moving the show to a new Wednesday night slot in January, ratings failed to improve, and on January 27, 2010, ABC confirmed that the series would end in April, at the same time reducing the season length from 22 to 20 episodes.

Following the events of the season-three finale, Betty is promoted to editor at Mode, but faces increased pressure when her former boyfriend Matt is named as her boss, in addition to hostility from Marc, who was passed over for promotion by Betty. Further storylines include Justin being bullied upon starting high school and subsequent relationship with male classmate Austin; Daniel struggling to adapt following Molly's death; Claire tracking down her long-lost son Tyler and his subsequent alcoholism; Hilda renewing her relationship with Bobby Telercio (Adam Rodriguez) and subsequent engagement and marriage.

The series concludes with the Suarez sisters leaving home, with Betty accepting a new job in London and Hilda and Justin moving out to live with Bobby. Daniel gives up his position at Mode, handing the reins to Wilhelmina, not wanting to lose Betty in his life; Marc's efforts are finally vindicated via promotion and Amanda is successful in finding her birth father. In the final scene, Daniel follows Betty to London and bumps into her, informing her that he is looking for his passion, and asks her out to dinner.

Following news of the show's cancellation, a number of former cast members returned to reprise their roles in guest appearances, including Ashley Jensen, Christopher Gorham, Freddy Rodríguez, and Grant Bowler.

Cast and characters

Episodes

Cancellation
On January 27, 2010, ABC announced that Ugly Betty would cease production after the fourth-season finale, which aired in April 2010. "We've mutually come to the difficult decision to make this Ugly Bettys final season," said executive producer Silvio Horta and ABC Entertainment president Steve McPherson in a joint statement. The show had struggled in the ratings in the US, falling from an average 8.1 million to 5.3 million viewers between the third and fourth seasons.

Future
On April 16, 2010, it was reported that an Ugly Betty film could be in the works. In an interview, Ortiz stated, "[t]here may be a movie. It's something that we've been talking about and it's something that America Ferrera would really love to do. That woman has so much determination that I can't imagine anything she puts her mind to not getting done."

On September 15, 2010, Ferrera stated that she knows of no plans for an Ugly Betty movie and that she thinks "the rumor is well and alive—it's always a possibility I suppose!" On September 29, 2010, Entertainment Weekly writer Michael Ausiello reported that a movie would not happen.

On November 9, 2011, Ferrera stated on Perezhilton.com that "[i]t's so wonderful that the fans care so much that this question about the movie just keeps coming up. It's not anything that's actually in the works but is something that's always a possibility, and it's wonderful to know that the fans want it."

On April 10, 2013, Urie was asked about his stance on a potential movie. He stated, "Oh my god, absolutely!  Everyone would jump right back on that! ... [Working on Ugly Betty] was the best and I'm still in close contact with all of those people."

On April 16, 2013, a Facebook Kickstarter campaign was started in the hopes of getting Silvio Horta's attention to create a movie. The campaign's goal was to follow in the footsteps of Veronica Mars, a series where the creators and fans had funded a follow-up movie through the same crowdsourcing website.

Spin-off

Mode After HoursMode After Hours is a spin-off web series that chronicles the adventures of Marc and Amanda when all (excluding security) staff members have left Mode for the night. The two usually plan on what to do in the future, dressing up as co-workers and mocking them, prepare for a date, going onto online dating sites, competing in certain activities, and inadvertently annoying security.

Though the show mainly features Marc and Amanda, a few other characters are seen whose faces are never shown. Perhaps the only other main character of the show is Marc and Amanda's only nemesis, who is, by far, the only mentioned Meade Publications security officer, named Sander, who is in charge of watching the Mode hallways. Sander would be a judge of some competitions between the two such as dancing, but on a negative note, he collects tapes of Marc and Amanda and is making a collection of the two fooling around.

Competition with other "Betty" offshoots
The series has been sold to TV networks and broadcasters in over 130 countries, making this version the most successful of the Betty La Fea franchise, but in the Guinness World Records 2010 El Libro De La Década, it stated that Yo Soy Betty La Fea is the most successful soap opera in the world, upstaging Ugly Betty.

In the U.S., Univision aired the Mexican counterpart La fea más bella, which ran weeknights at 8 p.m. (E/P), including Thursdays during the same time Ugly Betty airs. The star of the Mexican version, Angélica Vale, was anticipated to make a cameo in the 22nd episode, playing Betty's "counterpart" from the series, Leticia 'Lety' Padilla Solís; Vale instead appeared in the season finale playing Angelica, an orthodontist's assistant who looks exactly like Lety (pre-makeover).

Inspired versions
A version of Yo soy Betty, la fea made by Bosnian Federalna Televizija, Croatian RTL Televizija and Serbian Fox Televizija began airing in October 2007. The title of the show was Ne daj se, Nina ("Don't give up, Nina"). After a long audition, newcomer Lana Gojak was cast in the role of Nina (Betty). Other cast members were established actors such as Robert Kurbaša, Edvin Livarić, Bojana Ordinačev, Petar Ćiritović, Andrija Milošević, Kristina Krepela and Sloboda Mićalović. The first, and only, season consisted of just over 50 episodes. Although the storyline followed that of Yo soy Betty, la fea, Lana Gojak's appearance as Nina was based more on the heroine of Ugly Betty than on that of Yo soy Betty, la fea. The series had other elements that were directly borrowed from Ugly Betty. The series did well in ratings, but was too expensive to produce, so a second season was never ordered.

In 2007, an Arabic version of Ugly Betty was mentioned, which would have been produced and shot in Dubai. This would have been the first Betty, la Fea–inspired series to be directly adapted from the American version, but the project never came to fruition.

On May 24, 2010, the first (and so far only) direct adaptation of Ugly Betty, Georgia's გოგონა გარეუბნიდან (Gogona Gareubnidan, which means "suburban girl") premiered, a mere month and a half after Ugly Betty aired its series finale. The first season consisted of 10 episodes and concluded in August 2010.

On January 1, 2014, the first Arabic (Egyptian) version was set to air on OSN ya hala under the name هبة رجل الغراب (Heba Regl El Ghorab, which means "Heba the Leg of the Crow").

Colombian criticism
In November 2007, Sony Entertainment Television began airing Ugly Betty in South America with Spanish and Portuguese subtitles. However, in Colombia, criticisms about the American version were made, calling it a pale imitation and counterfeit copy of the original version. The series differ greatly; the Colombian version aired as a soap opera with daily cliffhangers, while Ugly Betty airs as a weekly comedy, with occasional cliffhangers. While the American version has more than half a dozen core characters, the Colombian version revolves only around Betty and her boss's life, with its main plot being Betty's unrequited love for her boss.

Syndication
The TV Guide Network has purchased the rights to air reruns of Ugly Betty on cable television. In addition to its cable run, Ugly Betty is also seen on local stations in the United States  as a double-run weekend offering, which began in September 2010.

Home media
Walt Disney Studios Home Entertainment (under the ABC Studios label) has released all four seasons of Ugly Betty on DVD in region 1, 2, 4.

The Ugly Betty: The Complete Collection was released on March 28, 2011, in United States, United Kingdom and various parts of the world. The complete series was not released in Region 4.

International broadcasts

Australia
Its debut episode on the Seven Network pulled in 2.03 million viewers, beating Nine's airing of 60 Minutes and Ten's airing of The Biggest Loser in the same time period. Since its debut the series has remained in the top five in the Australian TV ratings. The season one finale aired August 5, 2007, and received the lowest rating of the year – 1.051 million and only in the 13th slot of the night. This was predominantly because it aired in the same time-slot as the season premiere of rival program Australian Idol. After holding off on the 2nd season, it was announced in April 2008 that Seven would begin Ugly Betty's second season in a new 7:30 pm Wednesday time slot, beginning on May 7 The show has lost its large following, only drawing around 900,000 viewers despite strong advertising attempts by Channel Seven. The show was "shelved" after the ninth episode was shown on July 2, and will resume airing the remaining episodes until after the Olympics. It was replaced by "RSPCA Animal Rescue". Ugly Betty returned to Seven on August 28, 2008, at a new and later time slot of 9:30 pm Thursdays. The episode aired, "Bananas For Betty" was viewed by only 597,000 viewers and was removed. Seven later announced that Ugly Betty will return twice a week, every Tuesday and Thursday at 7:30 pm, starting when Summer begins. It was then moved to only once a week at Thursday 7:30 pm. Soon after, the show was pulled from screening (after finishing the second season) due to moderately low ratings. It was later confirmed on October 23, 2009, that Ugly Betty would return to Australian screens on Seven's new secondary digital channel 7Two. It will resume with the premiere of Season 3, "The Manhattan Project", starting Tuesday, November 3, 7:30 pm.

Canada
Citytv owns the English-language rights to the series, which aired in the same timeslot as the American broadcast until December 2009, when only the stations in Manitoba and British Columbia started airing it Wednesdays at 7 pm (same time as Eastern ABC where it would be 10 pm, aired earlier than US air in Manitoba), for Ontario and Alberta, OMNI simulcasted Betty Wednesdays at 10PM. In March 2010, Citytv aired Ugly Betty across Canada due to the cancellation of The Jay Leno Show, airing Wednesdays at 10 pm on Citytv, simulcasting ABC's broadcast up until final airing.

France
The first two episodes aired on TF1 on January 7, 2008, at late-night time, averaging about 3.8 million viewers (28.4% share) and 3.3 million viewers (39.4% share). Ugly Betty did well in key demos 15–24 (First episode: 46.8%, second episode: 56.7%) and 18–49 (First episode: 39.7%, second episode: 56.6%). But week after week, the show lost more than 1 million viewers, in part due to the late night schedule. In an effort to attract more viewers, two weekly TV magazines, Arthelius and Series TV Magazine, included Ugly Betty on their covers for their February 12, 2008, issues.

South Africa
Ugly Betty premiered in South Africa on Pay Channel, M-Net on Tuesday July 17, 2007. It later was re-broadcast on sister channels, GO and M-Net Holiday. The first season fared well with audiences and was a hit for the channel with strong buzz surrounding the show. Due to heavy promotions for the show across all media spectrums by M-Net, the premiere episode of Ugly Betty attracted 80% more viewers than Smallville which was the previous occupant of the time slot. M-Net marketing General Manager, Koo Govender, said the first episode was watched by about 432,000 viewers.

United Kingdom
The premiere on Channel 4 on January 5, 2007, attracted 4.89 million viewers. Two weeks later, Ugly Betty hit a new high with 5.5 million viewers watching the third episode. The figures and shares were similar each week, around 2–3 million viewers with 10–15% share; however, the finale rated less than the premiere episode, attracting 3.1 million viewers with 15% share. Due to the show's success and the fanbase it achieved in the United Kingdom, Channel 4 decided to move up the second-season premiere to Friday, October 5, 2007, thus allowing viewers to watch episodes one week after their U.S. airing.

Merchandising
On April 15, 2008, Hyperion Books, a Disney-owned publisher, released a companion book to the series, titled Ugly Betty: The Book, a 175-page softcover about the show in general, which covers the first season and portions of the second, complete with interviews from the cast and crew, tips and quotes from the characters, and mock ads for Fabia Cosmetics and Atlantic Attire. Around the same time, Random House's children's books division published a "magazine"-inspired book tied into the series, complete with photos and mock ads as if they were published by Betty herself, targeted for younger readers.

In addition, a 2008 calendar for Ugly Betty was released using stills from the first season, while a series of greeting cards was issued in January 2008. These photos were edited to enhance her facial features. A 2009 calendar was also released.

Even the main character has been immortalized into a doll, as Angelic Dreamz, Inc's Madame Alexander collection introduced two different versions of Betty Suarez that were featured on their website in February 2008.

In July 2009, Coca-Cola UK unveiled a special limited edition Diet Coke bottle created by Patricia Field called "The Betty" for sale in the United Kingdom as an exclusive for customers at Selfridges.

Reception

American ratings

Television parodies and references
The show has been parodied and referenced in other television shows. In the October 7, 2006, episode of Saturday Night Live, cast member Fred Armisen spoofed the character of Betty by playing a look-alike named Fugly Betsy. Not to be outdone, a February 17, 2007, episode of MADtv has Nicole Parker playing Ellen DeGeneres interviewing an actress on her talk show who plays Ugly Betty, with Salma Hayek (played by LisaNova) always pointing out how ugly she is. The Ugly Betty actress (played by Crista Flanagan) claims it is only makeup and costume but is ignored. Crista later reprised her Betty role in the poorly reviewed parody film Meet the Spartans.

On April 22, 2007, the 2007 TV Land Awards parodied the series with a spoof aptly titled "Ugly Betty White", with White playing Betty Suarez, Charo playing Hilda, Erik Estrada playing Ignacio, Joan Collins playing Wilhelmina, Peter Scolari playing Alexis, and George Hamilton playing Daniel. Thanks to her performance in that parody, the producers cast White as a guest star in the second season.

Even the cast poked fun at their alter egos. On October 30, 2006, three of the series' cast members, appearing in character (Ferrera as Betty, Mabius as Daniel, and Newton as Amanda), gave New England Patriots head coach Bill Belichick a "makeover" to make him look more like quarterback Tom Brady in a spoof that was featured on ESPN's Monday Night Countdown.

The program was also referenced in other shows, most notably in "Up All Night", the February 8, 2007, installment of the NBC sitcom 30 Rock, in which Liz Lemon (Tina Fey) says "this would've worked on Ugly Betty" when she fails to crawl out a door without being seen. The scene was patterned after the Ugly Betty episode "Swag" in which Betty crawled through a fashion show.

In an episode of the TV sitcom Scrubs, Christopher Turk (played by Donald Faison) has a picture taken of "Ugly Betty" with his daughter, only for it to be torn up by best friend and main character John Dorian.

In March 2009, a spoof of Ugly Betty, called Ugly Yeti was made by Take180.  Take180, like ABC, is a Disney company and the parody was featured on ABC's website.

Ugly Betty has also been referenced on television shows in the United Kingdom. In the series finale of BBC One hotel-based drama series Hotel Babylon, aired in August 2009, Ben Trueman (played by Michael Obiora) asks fellow front desk employee Melanie Hughes (played by Amy Nuttall) "How long have you had those Ugly Betty braces?" while giving Hughes a makeover, to which she replies: "About 18 months".
In a 2010 episode of medical drama series Holby City, which also airs on BBC One, Jac Naylor (played by Rosie Marcel) refers to a patient as "the one who wears the Ugly Betty braces".

In 2013, Ortiz returned to television in the Lifetime dramedy Devious Maids, which like Ugly Betty was also based on a telenovela. In the series, Ortiz plays Marisol Duarte, a newly hired maid who is determined to find out who framed her son for the murder of a maid. Ironically, it was revealed in the series' seventh episode "Taking a Message" that Marisol's true identity was that of a professor and her real last name was Suarez. It is not known if this was done intentionally but it does give Ortiz the homage of playing characters with the same last name on two different shows.

Promotion abroad
The buildup to "Bettymania" by various broadcasters also began to take shape overseas, most notably in the United Kingdom. On December 6, 2006, Channel 4 began to advertise the show. The ad shows seemingly attractive models gathered around a pool, but as the camera angle changes a model comes out of the pool wearing Betty's glasses, then as the models smile, they are all wearing Betty's braces. Another ad parodies Marks and Spencer's successful fashion advertising campaign, as well as Dove and Gap campaigns. A voice over then says, "Fashion has a new face. 'Ugly Betty' Coming Soon To 4." After a week of these teasers, clips from the actual program were included in the trailers. In mid-January, Davina McCall, presenter of Celebrity Big Brother dressed up as Betty live on Channel 4 before the titles of the second eviction show of the evening. On February 16, 2007, Ashley Jensen (Christina) also dressed up as Betty during an airing of Channel 4's Friday Night Project, where she was the guest host. The children's channel CBeebies also parodied the title sequence, with one variation mixing faces of regular CBeebies characters until finally settling with Tiny from Little Robots.

In Australia, during the week leading up to the Sunday premiere of Ugly Betty, February 12 to 17, 2007, Channel Seven devoted a week of Deal or No Deal to the show by having the models dress like Betty, complete with the Guadalajara poncho. Channel Seven also used the series to promote its successful "Beautiful Sundays" schedule.

In South Africa, M-Net teamed up with Ogilve Johannesburg to hype up its campaign for the show, which included a picture of Betty on the mock cover of Elle magazine.
New Zealand TV2 also hyped-up Ugly Betty by promoting Tuesday nights as "True Beauty Tuesday", and when the show moved to Sunday nights, it promoted them as "Beautiful Sunday". TV2 also launched competitions for a replica of Betty's poncho.

Cultural impact

Following the show's debut, the main characters, especially the title character, quickly became fixtures in the lexicon of pop media culture, with the show and its characters getting referenced in parodies, news media stories, and art-imitating-life situations. The show's impact on issues and culture also attracted the attention of the United States Congress, where on January 17, 2007, California congresswoman Hilda Solis (D-32nd, El Monte) saluted Ferrera on both her Golden Globe win and for bringing a positive profile to the Latin and Hispanic communities. In addition to that recognition, on May 8, 2007, star America Ferrera was honored by TIME on the magazine's annual list of the 100 most influential people. The event took place at New York's Lincoln Center and the actress was recognized for defying stereotypes with the show. The success of Ugly Betty and how it dealt with body imaging among women in general inspired a series of reports on Entertainment Tonight, in which reporter Vanessa Minnillo went undercover in a fatsuit to see if women were discriminated on the basis of appearance. LGBT awareness groups like GLAAD have also noted the positive impact the show has had particularly in regard to the coming out storyline of Betty's teenaged nephew Justin.

Awards and nominations

The series won two Golden Globe Awards on January 15, 2007, for "Best Leading Actress in a Comedy Series" (America Ferrera) and Best Comedy Series. Ferrera also won a SAG Award on January 28, 2007, for "Best Actress in a Comedy Series". On June 4, 2007, the series was honored with a Peabody Award "for demonstrating that wit and humanity never go out of style."

Ugly Betty won the Outstanding Comedy Series award by the Gay & Lesbian Alliance Against Defamation in April 2007. Judith Light also won a Prism Award for her portrayal of Claire Meade.

On July 19, 2007, the series received 11 nominations at the 59th Primetime Emmy Awards in the Comedy category (the most of any comedy series), including Outstanding Comedy Series, Best Actress (Ferrera), Best Supporting Actress (Williams), and Best Guest Starring Actress (Hayek for her role as Sofia; Light for her role as Claire. Both lost to Elaine Stritch). It won three awards — Best Casting in a Comedy Series, Best Direction in a Comedy Series (for the show's pilot episode), and Best Actress in a Comedy Series (Ferrera). For its second season, it received six other Primetime Emmy Award nominations, going home empty handed. Overall, Ugly Betty has been nominated for eighteen Emmy Awards.

Although The NAACP Image Awards honors African Americans in the entertainment industry, the series won five of the Image Awards' eight major TV categories, a rarity among television series with a multicultural cast. In addition to winning an Image award for the TV series in 2007 and Ferrera for best actress in 2008, Vanessa Williams won back-to-back honors (in 2007 and 2008) in the Supporting Actress category for her portrayal of Wilhelmina Slater.

Owing to the massive success of "Ugly Betty" in the United Kingdom, Ugly Betty was nominated for Most Popular Comedy Programme at the National Television Awards in October 2008, but lost to domestic ITV comedy series Benidorm.

The ALMA Awards honors the Hispanic entertainment community. During its first season, Ugly Betty won four of its first seven nominations, and in the second season took home three more, along with a Chevrolet Entertainer of the Year Award for Ferrera for her work on the show. Overall, the series has received 162 nominations.

See also
 List of Ugly Betty cast members
 List of Ugly Betty episodes

Notes

References

External links

Reviews

 Ugly Betty reviews at Metacritic
 first-look in USA Today (August 15, 2006)
 Review in USA Today (September 28, 2006)
 Comparisons between Ugly Betty and The Devil Wears Prada in USA Today (September 26, 2006)
 "It's a 'Bettification' project" from USA Today (October 4, 2006)
 
 from Pittsburgh Post-Gazette (September 27, 2006)
 from Seattle Post-Intelligencer (September 28, 2006)
 "Ugly, The American" from TIME (November 27, 2006)
 "Be Ugly '07" campaign announced in USA Today (December 20, 2006)
 "The Ugly Truth Behind the Beauty Premium" (January 9, 2013)

 
2006 American television series debuts
2010 American television series endings
2000s American comedy-drama television series
2000s American LGBT-related comedy television series
2000s American LGBT-related drama television series
2000s American romantic comedy television series
2000s American workplace comedy television series
2000s American workplace drama television series
2000s romantic drama television series
2010s American comedy-drama television series
2010s American LGBT-related comedy television series
2010s American LGBT-related drama television series
2010s American romantic comedy television series
2010s American workplace comedy television series
2010s American workplace drama television series
2010s romantic drama television series
American Broadcasting Company original programming
American romantic drama television series
American television series based on Colombian television series
American television series based on telenovelas
Best Musical or Comedy Series Golden Globe winners
Comedy telenovelas
English-language television shows
Fashion-themed television series
Gay-related television shows
Hispanic and Latino American television
Latino sitcoms
Mass media portrayals of the working class
Peabody Award-winning television programs
Primetime Emmy Award-winning television series
Television series about families
Television series about journalism
Television series by ABC Studios
Television series by Reveille Productions
Television shows filmed in Los Angeles
Television shows filmed in New York City
Television shows set in Manhattan
Television shows set in Queens
Transgender-related television shows
Works about fashion magazine publishing
Yo soy Betty, la fea